Magnus of Sweden may refer to:

Magnus I, King of Sweden around 1125
Magnus II, King of Sweden 1160
Magnus III, King of Sweden 1275
Magnus IV, King of Sweden 1319, also Magnus VII of Norway
Magnus, Prince of Sweden 1300 and heir apparent, son of King Birger
Magnus, Duke of Östergötland, Prince of Sweden 1542